La Chapelle-Glain is a commune in the Loire-Atlantique département in western France.

Geography
La Chapelle-Glain is 31 km north of Ancenis, 55 km west of Angers, 66 km northwest of Nantes and 85 km south of Rennes.

The bordering communes are Juigné-des-Moutiers, Saint-Julien-de-Vouvantes, Petit-Auverné, Saint-Sulpice-des-Landes and Le Pin in Loire-Atlantique, and Challain-la-Potherie and Saint-Michel-et-Chanveaux in the neighboring department of the Maine-et-Loire.

Population

Sights
 The Château de la Motte-Glain is a 15th-century castle, remodelled in the 17th century.
 The church of Saint-Pierre-et-Saint-Paul contains a number of sculptures, pictures and other objects that are listed as historic items by the French Ministry of Culture.

See also
Communes of the Loire-Atlantique department

References

Communes of Loire-Atlantique